116 John Street is a historic office tower at the southwest corner of John Street and Pearl Street in the Financial District of Lower Manhattan in New York City. It was built in 1931, and is a 35-story brick and terra cotta building consisting of a three-story base, a 19-story shaft, and 12 upper stories that recede in a series of setbacks. The building features Art Deco style design elements at the recessed entrances and in the lobby. Built as a speculative office building for insurance companies, the building interior was rehabilitated in 2013 and some floors converted to apartments.

It was listed on the National Register of Historic Places in 2014.

References

External links

Office buildings on the National Register of Historic Places in Manhattan
Art Deco architecture in Manhattan
Office buildings completed in 1931
Office buildings in Manhattan
Financial District, Manhattan